Alice Hart (born Alice Marion Rowland; 1848-1931) was a British philanthropist, artist, and businesswoman.

Early life and education
Hart was born Alice Marion Rowland to Alex William Rowland and his wife, Henrietta Maria Margeretta Ditges. He was part of the Rowland Macassar oil company family. The family lived in London at Lower Sydenham. Hart was educated at the Apothecaries Society in London and went on to further study medicine in Paris. One of her sisters, Fanny, was badly brain-damaged. Another sister was Dame Henrietta Rowland Barnett who was also a philanthropist. Together these two sisters taught the poor at Toynbee Hall.

Career
In 1883 Hart went to Donegal with her husband where they discovered extreme poverty. Hart made an appeal publicly for money to deal with the acute issues but also saw the need to find a way to deal with the chronic unemployment in the area. Sha also noticed and was impressed by the standard of local craftmanship.  She decided that the best option was to revive the local cottage industries, especially of weaving tweed. By the end of 1883 the Donegal Industrial Fund had been founded with £50 capital and contacts in London for a market for knits. In 1884 the Donegal tweed was shown at the London International Health exhibition and was so successful that Hart opened a shop at 31 New Cavendish St., London. Hart worked with the local weavers, sending designs and examples of Scottish tweeds to them and by experimenting with dyes from local plants. The result was dyes that won a Sanitary Institute of Great Britain medal.

In 1885 Hart expanded her ideas, appealing to Irish women for help in setting up embroidery schools which resulted in the ‘Kells embroidery’ schools. Classes were held all over the country teaching the embroidery of flax on linen using designs from Irish manuscripts and Japanese art. Hart may have created the Japanese designs herself as she and her husband owned an important collection of Japanese art and she was a noted watercolourist. She had paintings shown in both the Dudley and Dowdeswell galleries as well as being commended by the Magazine of Art in 1895 for her far east landscapes.

The Kells schools produced household items which were displayed at the London International Inventions Exhibition in 1885 where they won a gold medal. By 1886 the Donegal industrial fund moved to bigger premises into what became known as ‘Donegal House’ at 43 Wigmore St., London. They were given a grant to allow for further schools to be opened for instruction in weaving and embroidery. Hart also invested her own and her friends money into the business. In 1888 at the Irish Exhibition held in Olympia, London she set up the successful exhibit of the a ‘Donegal industrial village’. She followed the original crafts with investment in carpentry and woodcarving. Farm labourers from Donegal were brought to train in the Regent St. Polytechnic until the workshop was opened in Gweedore in October 1891. Apart from the more usual household goods the shop also got commissions from people like Lady Aberdeen. She initially assisted Hart in the creation of an industrial village at the Chicago World's Fair in 1893, though a later falling out meant that there were two such villages present.

Throughout the work with the fund Hart painted. After a trip to Burma with her husband she wrote a book on the people and the country. She became the editor of House Beautiful in 1904. The Donegal Industrial Fund itself didn't survive long after Hart was no longer involved. But it had created huge support for the industries and trained large numbers of people in the area.

Bibliography
 
 
 The Third Or Invisible Norris Corpuscle 
 
 
 
 Cornil And Ranvier's Pathological Histology (Translator)

Personal life
She married Ernest Hart in 1872, becoming his second wife. He was a surgeon and editor of the British Medical Journal. Hart ended managing the Donegal Industrial fund in 1896. Her husband had become unwell and he died in January 1898. They had no children. Hart died in 1931.

Further reading
 Alice Hart, Cottage industries and what they can do for Ireland (1885)
 
 Home Art Work, Apr. 1902, 26, 28
 Creutzner, The dictionary of British artists, 1880–1940 (1976)
 Paul Larmour, ‘The Donegal industrial fund and its cottage industries’, GPA Arts Review Yearbook (1990–91), 128–34
 Anne Commire, Women in world history: a biographical encyclopedia (2000), vii
 Janice Holland, ‘Working bodies, Celtic textiles and the Donegal Industrial Fund, 1883–90’, Textile: the journal of cloth and culture, ii, no. 2 (July 2004), 134–55

References

1848 births
1931 deaths
British philanthropists
British women painters
19th-century British businesswomen
20th-century British businesswomen
19th-century British women artists
20th-century British women artists
Embroidery in the United Kingdom